The Jié were members of a tribe of northern China in the fourth century. During the period of the Sixteen Kingdoms, they were regarded by the Han people as one of the Five Barbarians. Under Shi Le, they established the Later Zhao dynasty. The Jie were defeated by Ran Min in the Wei–Jie war in 350 following the fall of the Later Zhao. Chinese historians continued to document the Jie people and their activities after the Wei–Jie war.

Name and origins
There are widely differing accounts of the exact ethnic origins of the Jie, with one theory uncertainly suggesting that they spoke a Yeniseian language, while other authors have proposed a Turkic language.

According to the Book of Wei (6th century AD), the name Jie was derived from the Jiéshì area (羯室, modern Yushe County in Shanxi province), where the Jie resided.

According to the Book of Jin, the ancestors of Shi Le were a part of the multi-ethnic Xiongnu tribe known as Qiāngqú (羌渠). Edwin Pulleyblank believes the Qiangqu represent the Kangju state of Sogdia. Although Pulleyblank suggested that they might have been Tocharian in origin, most scholars believe that Kangju was constituted by an Eastern Iranian people. Some have linked the names Shi (石) and Jie (羯) to a Sogdian statelet known as 石國 Shíguó (literally, "Stone Country", at Chach Zhěshí 赭時, now Tashkent, also meaning "Stone City" in Common Turkic). Also, An Lushan, a Tang rebel general, had a Sogdian stepfather and was called a Jiehu.

The name of the parent house of Turko-Mongol Barlas and Borjigin clans (house of Genghis Khan and Timur) was Kiyat, almost identical to the Middle Chinese pronunciation of the name Jie, /ki̯at/.

Others claim that the Jie were an ancient Yeniseian-speaking tribe related to the Ket people, who today live between the Ob and Yenisey rivers—the character 羯 (jié) is pronounced /kiɛt̚/ in Hokkien, /kʰiːt̚/ or /kiːt̚/ in Cantonese, /ciat̚/ in Hakka and ketsu in Japanese, implying that the ancient pronunciation might have been fairly close to Ket (kʰet). The root  may be transliterated as Jié- or Tsze2- and an older form, < kiat, may also be reconstructed. This ethnonym might be cognate with the ethnonyms of Yeniseian-speaking peoples, such as the Ket  and the Kott (who spoke the extinct Kott language). Pulleyblank (1962) connected the ethnonym to Proto-Yeniseian *qeˀt/s "stone". Vovin et al. (2016) also pointed to *keˀt "person, human being" as another possible source. Alexander Vovin also suggests that the Xiongnu spoke a Yeniseian language, further connecting them with the Jie people.

Western Washington University historical linguist Edward Vajda spent a year in Siberia studying the Ket people and their language and his findings helped substantiate such conjecture into the origins of the Ket people from Eurasia. He further proposes a relationship of the Ket language to the Na-Dene languages indigenous to Canada and western United States, and even suggests the tonal system of the Ket language is closer to that of Vietnamese than any of the native Siberian languages.

Among the Yeniseian languages, Jie is hypothesized to be Pumpokolic. Vovin, Vajda, and de la Vaissière have suggested that Jie shares the same idiosyncrasies with the Pumpokol language, and the two are therefore closely related. This argument is strengthened by the fact that in northern Mongolia, Yeniseian-derived hydronyms have been demonstrated to be exclusively Pumpokolic, while influence from other Yeniseian languages is only found further north. This therefore lends credence to the theory that the Jie are a Pumpokolic-speaking tribe, and confirms that the Pumpokolic-speaking Yeniseians existed in the core territory of the Xiongnu state.

Other sources link the Jie to the Lesser Yuezhi (Xiao Yuezhi 小月氏), who remained in China as vassals of the Xiongnu and then the Han dynasty.

Jie language 

Only one phrase in the native language of the Jie is known. The source for this phrase was a Kuchean Buddhist monk and missionary Fotudeng. It was recorded in the Book of Jin as 秀支 替戾剛 僕谷 劬禿當 and said to have a connection to Shi Le's fight against Liu Yao in 328. The phrase was glossed with a Chinese translation:

This phrase has been analyzed in a number of publications. Shiratori (1900), Ramstedt (1922), Bazin (1948), von Gabain (1950), Shervashidze (1986), and Shimunek (2015) recognized Turkic lexicon, and gave their versions of the transcription and translation:

Edwin G. Pulleyblank (1963) argued that the Turkic interpretations cannot be considered very successful because they conflict with the phonetic values of the Chinese text and with the Chinese translation. Instead, he suggested a connection with the Yeniseian languages.

Alexander Vovin (2000) gave the following translation based on Yeniseian. Vovin (2000) suggests a connection with the Southern Yeniseian branch.

The verbal ending -ŋ can be seen in Jie, which is a common verb ending in Yeniseian languages. The cognate form of the Jie words "kot-o-kt-aŋ" 'they will catch' in Ket is "d-kas-a-qos-n", showing the characteristic of Pumpokol where the sound /t/ corresponds the Ket sound /s/, thus Jie is thought to be closely related to Pumpokol. The Arin word 'kel' 'fight' partly coincides in the second syllable of suke 'army', however the connection is dubious and Vovin suggested it to be a loanword, because if Pumpokolic speakers became part of Xiongnu, the word for army would have likely been loaned.

History
In 319, Jie general Shi Le established the state of Later Zhao in North China, which supplanted the Xiongnu-led Han Zhao (304-329) state. However, the Later Zhao state collapsed in 351. In the period between 350 and 352, during the Wei–Jie war, General Ran Min ordered the complete extermination of the Jie, who were easily identified by high noses and full beards, leading to large numbers being killed. According to some sources more than 200,000 of them were slain. Despite this, the Jie continue to appear occasionally in history over the next 200 years. Both Erzhu Rong and Hou Jing, two famous warlords of the Northern Dynasties, were identified as Qihu and Jiehu respectively and modern scholars have suggested that they could have been be related to the Jie.

Cultural influences
Fang Xuanling recorded in the Book of Jin chronicle that at around 340 a Jie state Later Zhao's which ruled part of North China had a Chinese scholar Xie Fei (together with Wei Mengbian) serving as a Head of Healing (Medicinal) Department in the Later Zhao State Chancellery, was a mechanical engineer who built a south-pointing chariot (also called south-pointing carriage), a directional compass vehicle that apparently did not use magnetic principle, but was operated by use of differential gears (which apply an equal amount of torque to driving wheels rotating at different speeds), or a similar angular differential principle.

For the great ingenuity shown in the construction of the device, the Later Zhao Emperor Shi Hu granted Jie Fei the noble title of hou without land possessions and rewarded him generously.

See also
Ethnic groups in Chinese history
Zhongshan (state)

Notes

References

Citations

Sources 

 Wang, Zhonghan. "Outlines of Ethnic Groups in China", Taiyuan, Shanxi Education Press, 2004, p. 133, .

External links
羯語記載 The language of Jie ( Kiet ) – earliest Turkic language phrase recorded in Chinese Chronicle(Chinese Traditional Big5 code page) via Internet Archive

Ancient peoples of China
Ethnic groups in Chinese history
Five Barbarians
Later Zhao
Xiongnu